Ferdinando Spinola (Genoa, 1692 – Genoa, 1778) was Marquis of Arquata Scrivia and the 172nd Doge of the Republic of Genoa.

Biography 
After the elecetion 7 January 1773, Grand Council chose Spinola as the new Doge of the Republic of Genoa. A nomination that the Marquis Ferdinando Spinola did not immediately accept, citing reasons related to his advanced seniority and precarious state of health in the first instance. 12 days had to pass before the Government and the Senate of the Republic formalized the abdication of the doge. He was married to Margherita de Carion Nezoz, countess of Morviel, and died in Genoa in 1778 at the age of 86. In the absence of  heirs, the title of Marquis of Arquata Scrivia passed to his nephew Agostino Spinola.

See also 

 Republic of Genoa
 Doge of Genoa
 House of Spinola

References

18th-century Doges of Genoa
1692 births
1778 deaths